Dominion Voting Systems Corporation is a company that produces and sells electronic voting hardware and software, including voting machines and tabulators, in Canada and the United States. The company's headquarters are in Toronto, Ontario, where it was founded, and Denver, Colorado. It develops software in offices in the United States, Canada, and Serbia.

Dominion produces electronic voting machines, which allow voters to cast their votes electronically as well as optical scanning devices used to tabulate paper ballots. Dominion voting machines have been used in countries around the world, primarily in Canada and the United States. Dominion systems are employed in Canada's major party leadership elections, and they are also employed across the nation in local and municipal elections. Dominion products have been increasingly used in the United States in recent years. In the 2020 United States presidential election, equipment manufactured by Dominion was used to process votes in twenty-eight states, including the swing states of Wisconsin and Georgia.

The company was subjected to extensive attention following the 2020 election, in which then-president Donald Trump was defeated by Joe Biden, with Trump and various surrogates promoting conspiracy theories, which falsely alleged that Dominion was part of an international cabal that stole the election from Trump, and that it used its voting machines to transfer millions of votes that had been cast for Trump instead to Biden. There was no evidence supporting these claims, which have been debunked by various groups including election technology experts, government and voting industry officials, and the Cybersecurity and Infrastructure Security Agency (CISA). These conspiracy theories were further discredited by hand recounts of the ballots cast in the 2020 presidential elections in Georgia and Wisconsin; the hand recounts in these states found that Dominion voting machines had accurately tabulated votes, that any error in the initial tabulation was instead caused by human error, and that Biden had defeated Trump in both battleground states.

In December 2020 and January 2021, Fox News, Fox Business, Newsmax, and the American Thinker withdrew allegations they had reported about Dominion and Smartmatic after one or both companies threatened legal action for defamation. In January 2021, Dominion filed defamation lawsuits against former Trump campaign lawyers Sidney Powell and Rudy Giuliani, seeking $1.3 billion in damages from each. After Dominion filed its lawsuit against Powell, One America News Network (OANN) removed all references to Dominion and Smartmatic from its website, though without issuing public retractions. During subsequent months, Dominion filed suits seeking $1.6 billion in damages from each of Fox News, Newsmax, OANN and former Overstock.com CEO Patrick Byrne, while also suing Mike Lindell and his corporation, MyPillow. 

Despite motions by the defendants to dismiss the lawsuits, judges ruled that the cases against Fox News, Lindell, and MyPillow could proceed.

Company

Dominion Voting Systems Corporation was founded in 2002 in Toronto, Ontario, Canada, by John Poulos and James Hoover. The company develops proprietary software in-house and sells electronic voting hardware and software, including voting machines and tabulators, in the U.S. and Canada and employs a development team in its Serbian office. The company maintains headquarters in Toronto and in Denver, Colorado. Its name derives from the Dominion Elections Act.

Acquisitions
In May 2010, Dominion acquired Premier Election Solutions (formerly Diebold Election Systems, Inc.) from Election Systems & Software (ES&S). ES&S had just acquired Premier from Diebold and was required to sell off Premier by the United States Department of Justice over anti-trust concerns. In June 2010, Dominion acquired Sequoia Voting Systems.

In 2018, Dominion was acquired by its management and Staple Street Capital, a private equity firm.

Officers
Poulos, President and CEO of Dominion, has a BSc in electrical engineering from the University of Toronto and an MBA from INSEAD. Hoover, Vice President, has an MSc in mechanical engineering from the University of Alberta.

Equipment
Dominion Voting Systems (DVS) sells electronic voting systems hardware and software, including voting machines and tabulators, in the United States and Canada. This equipment includes the DVS ImageCast Evolution (ICE), ImageCast X (ICX), and ImageCast Central (ICC).

ImageCast Evolution is an optical scan tabulator designed for use in voting precincts that scans and tabulates marked paper ballots. The ICE will also mark ballots for voters with disabilities using an attached accessibility device that enables all voters to cast votes with paper ballots on the same machine. When a marked paper ballot is inserted, the tabulator screen display messages indicating whether the ballot has been successfully input. Causes of rejection include a blank ballot, an overvoted ballot, and unclear marks. After the polls close, results from the encrypted memory cards of each ICE tabulator can be transferred and uploaded to the central system to tally and report the results.

ImageCast X is described as an accessible ballot-marking device that allows a voter to use various methods to input their choices. An activation card is required for use, which is provided by a poll worker. The machine has audio capability for up to ten languages, as required by the U.S. Department of Justice, and includes a 19" full-color screen for visual operation, audio and visual marking interfaces and Audio-Tactile Interface (ATI). ATI is a hand-held controller that coordinates with headphones and connects directly to the ICE. During the voting process, the machine generates a marked paper ballot that serves as the official ballot record. The display can be adjusted with contrast and zoom functions that automatically reset at the end of the session. The ATI device has raised keys with tactile function, includes the headphone jack and a T-coil coupling, and has a T4 rating for interference. It uses light pressure switches and may be equipped with a pneumatic switch, commonly known as "sip-n-puff", or a set of paddles.

ImageCast Central uses commercial off-the-shelf Canon DR-X10C or Canon DR-G1130 scanners at a central tabulation location to scan vote-by-mail and post-voting ballots like provisional ballots, ballots requiring duplication and ballots scanned into multi-precinct ICE tabulators. The results are dropped into a folder located on the server where they can be accessed by the Adjudication Client software.

Software
DVS voting machines operate using a suite of proprietary software applications, including Election Management System, Adjudication Client, and Mobile Ballot Printing. The software allows for various settings, including cumulative voting, where voters can apply multiple votes on one or more candidates, and Ranked Order Voting, where voters rank candidates in order of choice and the system shifts votes as candidates are eliminated.

The Election Management System (EMS) includes a set of applications that handle pre- and post-voting activities, including ballot layout, programming media for voting equipment, generation of audio files, importing results data, and accumulating and reporting results.

Adjudication Client is a software application with administrative and ballot inspection roles. It allows a jurisdiction to resolve problems in a ballot on screen that would normally be rejected, to be remade or hand counted because of one or more exceptional conditions like a blank ballot, write-ins, over-votes, marginal marks and under-votes. The application configures user accounts, reasons for exception, batch management and report generation, which in some jurisdictions must be performed by an administrator directly on a server. Ballot inspection allows users to review ballots with exceptional conditions and either accept or resolve the ballot according to state laws. Each adjudicated ballot is marked with the username of the poll worker who made the change.

Mobile Ballot Printing operates in conjunction with the EMS, which creates printable ballot images in .pdf format including tints and watermarks. The image is exported to a laptop and then printed on blank paper to provide a ballot record. After configuration and setup are complete, the laptop only contains geopolitical information and no voter data. The system will also generate reports in Excel, Word and .pdf format, including total number of ballots printed and ballot style.

Operations

United States 
Dominion is the second-largest seller of voting machines in the United States. In 2016, its machines served 70 million voters in 1,600 jurisdictions. In 2019, the state of Georgia selected Dominion Voting Systems to provide its new statewide voting system beginning in 2020.

In total, 28 states used Dominion voting machines to tabulate their votes during the 2020 United States presidential election, including most of the swing states. Dominion's role in this regard led supporters of then-President Donald Trump to promote conspiracy theories about the company's voting machines, following Trump's loss to Joe Biden in the election.

Canada 
In Canada, Dominion's systems are deployed nationwide. Currently, Dominion provides optical scan paper ballot tabulation systems for provincial elections, including Ontario and New Brunswick. Dominion also provides ballot tabulation and voting systems for Canada's major party leadership elections, including those of the Liberal Party of Canada, the Conservative Party of Canada, and the Progressive Conservative Party of Ontario.

Ontario was the first Canadian province to use Dominion's tabulator machines in select municipalities in the 2006 municipal elections. New Brunswick used Dominion's 763 tabulator machines in the 2014 provincial elections. There were some problems with the reporting of tabulator counts after the election, and at 10:45 p.m. Elections New Brunswick officially suspended the results reporting count with 17 ridings still undeclared. The Progressive Conservatives and the People's Alliance of New Brunswick called for a hand count of all ballots. Recounts were held in 7 of 49 ridings and the results were upheld with variations of 1–3 votes per candidate per riding. This delay in results reporting was caused by an off-the-shelf software application unrelated to Dominion.

In June 2018, Elections Ontario used Dominion's tabulator machines for the provincial election and deployed them at 50 percent of polling stations.

Dominion's architecture was also widely used in the 2018 Ontario municipal elections on October 22, 2018, particularly for online voting. However, 51 of the province's municipalities had their elections impacted when the company's colocation centre provider imposed an unauthorized bandwidth cap due to the massive increase in voting traffic in the early evening, thus making it impossible for many voters to cast their vote at peak voting time. The affected municipalities extended voting times to compensate for the glitch; most prominently, the city of Greater Sudbury, the largest city impacted by the cap, extended voting for a full 24 hours and announced no election results until the evening of October 23.

2020 U.S. presidential election 

Following the 2020 United States presidential election, Donald Trump, his attorneys, and other right-wing personalities amplified the unfounded rumors originated by the proponents of the far-right QAnon conspiracy theory that Dominion Voting Systems had been compromised, supposedly resulting in millions of votes intended for Trump either being deleted or going to rival Joe Biden.  Within days after the election, the Trump campaign had prepared an internal memo on several of the allegations against Dominion, and found them to be baseless. Trump persisted in the claims, citing the pro-Trump OANN media outlet, which itself claimed to cite a report from Edison Research, an election monitoring group. Edison Research said that they did not write such a report, and that they had "no evidence of any voter fraud".

Trump and others also made unsubstantiated claims that Dominion had close ties to the Clinton family or other Democrats. There is no evidence for any of these claims, which have been debunked by various groups including election technology experts, government and voting industry officials, and the CISA. On November 12, 2020, CISA released a statement that confirmed "there is no evidence that any voting system deleted or lost votes, changed votes or was in any way compromised". The statement was signed by various government and voting industry officials including the presidents of the National Association of State Election Directors and the National Association of Secretaries of State.

Trump's personal attorney Rudy Giuliani made several false assertions about Dominion, including that its voting machines used software developed by a competitor, Smartmatic, which he claimed actually owned Dominion, and which he said was founded by the former socialist Venezuelan leader Hugo Chávez. Giuliani also falsely asserted that Dominion voting machines sent their voting data to Smartmatic at foreign locations and that it is a "radical-left" company with connections to antifa. These accusations of a connection between Dominion and Smartmatic were made on conservative television outlets, and Smartmatic sent them a letter demanding a retraction and threatening legal action. Fox News host Lou Dobbs had been outspoken during his program about the accusations, and on December 18 his program aired a video segment refuting the accusations, though Dobbs himself did not comment. Fox News hosts Jeanine Pirro and Maria Bartiromo had also been outspoken about the allegations, and both their programs aired the same video segment over the following two days. Smartmatic also demanded a retraction from Newsmax, which had also promoted baseless conspiracy allegations about the company and Dominion, and on December 21 a Newsmax host acknowledged the network had no evidence the companies had a relationship, adding "No evidence has been offered that Dominion or Smartmatic used software or reprogrammed software that manipulated votes in the 2020 election." The host further acknowledged that Smartmatic is not owned by any foreign entity, nor is it connected to George Soros, as had been alleged. Dominion sent a similar letter to former Trump attorney Sidney Powell demanding she retract her allegations and retain all relevant records; the Trump legal team later instructed dozens of staffers to preserve all documents for any future litigation.

In a related hoax, Dennis Montgomery, a software designer with a history of making dubious claims, asserted that a government supercomputer program was used to switch votes from Trump to Biden on voting machines. Trump attorney Sidney Powell promoted the allegations on Lou Dobbs's Fox Business program two days after the election, and again two days later on Maria Bartiromo's program, claiming to have "evidence that that is exactly what happened". Christopher Krebs, the director of the Cybersecurity and Infrastructure Security Agency, characterized the claim as "nonsense" and a "hoax". Asserting that Krebs's analysis was "highly inaccurate, in that there were massive improprieties and fraud", Trump fired him by tweet days later.

Powell also asserted she had an affidavit from a former Venezuelan military official, a portion of which she posted on Twitter without a name or signature, who asserted that Dominion voting machines would print a paper ballot showing who a voter had selected, but change the vote inside the machine. Apparently speaking about the ICE machine, one source responded that this was incorrect, and that Dominion voting machines are only a "ballot marking device" system in which the voter deposits their printed ballot into a box for counting.

The disinformation campaign against Dominion led to their employees being stalked, harassed, and receiving death threats. Ron Watkins, a leading proponent of the QAnon conspiracy theory, posted videos on Twitter in early December of a Dominion employee using one of the machines, falsely stating that the employee was pictured tampering with election results. The employee received death threats as a result, and a noose was found hanging outside his home. Eric Coomer, Dominion's director of product strategy and security, went into hiding soon after the election due to fear for his and his family's safety. He said that his personal address had been posted online, as had those of everyone from his parents and siblings to ex-girlfriends. In one of their lawsuits, Dominion explained they had spent $565,000 on security as a result.

After questions about the reliability of the company's systems surfaced during the election, Edward Perez, an election technology expert at the Open Source Election Technology Institute stated, "Many of the claims being asserted about Dominion and questionable voting technology is misinformation at best and, in many cases, they're outright disinformation."

During the 2021 German federal election, the Center for Monitoring, Analysis and Strategy found that accusations of Dominion engaging in voter fraud were common among German far-right users of Telegram, despite the company's technology not being used in German elections.

In September 2022, officials in Fulton County, Pennsylvania, filed a lawsuit against Dominion, alleging that a third party computer forensics expert had discovered a Python script infection on one of its voting machines, and that there was evidence that the machine had been connected to an external system located in Canada.

Defamation lawsuits

Coomer lawsuit
On December 22, 2020, lawyers representing Eric Coomer, Dominion's director of product strategy and security (who had been forced to go into hiding due to death threats), filed a defamation lawsuit on his behalf in the state of Colorado. The filing stated that the "false and baseless" claims against him have caused "immense injury to Dr. Coomer's reputation, professional standing, safety, and privacy". Among those named in the lawsuit were the Trump campaign, Rudy Giuliani, Sidney Powell, conservative commentator Michelle Malkin, and Colorado businessman and activist Joseph Oltmann. Additionally, conservative media outlets OANN, Newsmax, and The Gateway Pundit were also named. Coomer asserted they had characterized him as a "traitor" and that as a result he was subjected to "multiple credible death threats". Coomer also said that Oltmann had falsely claimed in a podcast that Coomer had participated in a September 2020 conference call with members of antifa, and that during the call he had said, "Don't worry about the election, Trump is not gonna win. I made f-ing sure of that. Hahahaha." In April 2021, Newsmax published a retraction and apology on its website, saying it "found no evidence" to support the allegations against Coomer. Powell, who had asserted there was a recording of Coomer saying this, acknowledged in a July 2021 deposition that no such recording existed. Dominion itself was not party to the suit, but released a statement saying "Sidney Powell and many others—including some news organizations—have trampled on countless reputations as they pandered their ridiculous conspiracy theories."

On October 7, 2021, CNN reported that after examining over 2,000 pages of documents provided to the court, that they had found that in sworn depositions to the court Giuliani stated that he had spent less than an hour reviewing allegations against Coomer and "didn't have the time" to fact check them before taking them public in a November 19, 2020 press conference where he called Coomer "a vicious, vicious man" who is "close to Antifa" and is "completely warped and he specifically says that they're going to fix this election". In a deposition Powell admitted to Coomer's lawyers that she did not have "a lot of specific knowledge about what Mr. Coomer personally did" in the supposed election conspiracy. She also admitted to Coomer's lawyers that her claim that he had been "recorded in a conversation with antifa members, saying that he had the election rigged for Mr. Biden", was mistaken as there was no such recording.

On April 5, 2022, Coomer filed a lawsuit in Denver District Court against MYPillow CEO Mike Lindell, along with his company, and his media platform Frankspeech for spreading the unsupported Oltmann claims and having "intentionally and persistently defamed Coomer as a 'traitor.

On May 13, 2022, Colorado State District Judge Marie Avery Moses rejected motions to dismiss the case made by the Trump campaign, Powell, Giuliani, and other defendants. She ruled that there was evidence of actual malice which Coomer would need to prove in trial.

Defamation lawsuit against Fox News

In December 2020, defamation attorneys representing Dominion sent letters to Trump personal attorney Rudy Giuliani, White House counsel Pat Cipollone, and former Dominion contractor and self-described whistleblower Mellissa Carone, advising them to preserve all records relating to the company and demanding Giuliani and Carone cease making defamatory claims about the company, warning that legal action was "imminent". Carone had alleged in testimony that "Everything that happened at that [Detroit ballot counting facility] was fraud. Every single thing." The letter to Carone asserted that, despite Carone presenting herself as a Dominion insider, she was "hired through a staffing agency for one day to clean glass on machines and complete other menial tasks". Michigan Circuit Court judge Timothy Kenny had previously ruled that an affidavit Carone had filed was "simply not credible".

Dominion sent My Pillow CEO and Trump supporter Mike Lindell a letter in January 2021 stating, "you have positioned yourself as a prominent leader of the ongoing misinformation campaign" and that "litigation regarding these issues is imminent". Lindell told The New York Times, "I would really welcome them to sue me because I have all the evidence against them".

Under threat of litigation, on January 15, 2021, the conservative online magazine American Thinker published a retraction of stories it published asserting that Dominion engaged in a conspiracy to rig the election, acknowledging, "these statements are completely false and have no basis in fact". Fox News, Fox Business, and Newsmax all aired fact checks of their own previous coverage of Dominion and competitor Smartmatic after Smartmatic threatened lawsuits, and after they were listed as other groups spreading falsehoods about Dominion in the lawsuit by Dominion against Giuliani.

Dominion filed defamation lawsuits against former Trump campaign lawyer Sidney Powell on January 8, 2021, and against Giuliani on January 25, 2021, asking for $1.3 billion in damages from each. Both lawsuits accused Powell and Giuliani of waging a "viral disinformation campaign" against the company involving "demonstrably false" claims. In the lawsuit against Powell, the company stated that Powell had "doubled down" after Dominion formally notified her that her claims were false, and had posted on Twitter to spread false claims to over one million followers. One of Dominion's attorneys explained they had filed the lawsuit against Powell first "because she's been the most prolific and in many ways has been the originator of these false statements". The suit against Giuliani is based on more than fifty statements by Giuliani made on his podcast, at legislative hearings, on Twitter, and in conservative media, and alleges that Giuliani made false statements about the company in an attempt to earn money from legal fees and through his podcast.

After Dominion filed the lawsuit against Powell, OANN removed all references to Dominion and Smartmatic from its website without issuing public retractions.

In court documents, Dominion's legal team, out of "professional courtesy", stated that they would not oppose the request of Powell's legal team for more time to prepare, but noted that she had "evaded service of process for weeks", forcing them to "incur unnecessary expenses" to serve her with the lawsuit. These included "hiring private investigators and pursuing Powell across state lines", and while evading being served, she "refused to respond to requests" offering waivers that could have given her more time to react to the complaint. The suit against Powell had been filed on January 8, 2021, but those employed by Dominion were only able to serve her the summons on January 28, 2021. Her attorney Howard Kleinhendler denied she had tried to evade service, noting that she travels a lot and "has had to take extra precautions concerning her security, which may have made serving her more difficult. Ms. Powell had no reason to evade service as she looks forward to defending herself in court."

On February 16, 2021, Dominion announced that they would be filing a lawsuit against Lindell in response to OANN airing a program by Lindell titled Absolute Proof that repeated his false claims about the 2020 election. Six days later, Dominion filed defamation lawsuits against My Pillow and Lindell. The lawsuit, which asked for $1.3 billion in damages, alleged, "MyPillow's defamatory marketing campaign—with promo codes like 'FightforTrump', '45', 'Proof', and 'QAnon'—has increased MyPillow sales by 30–40% and continues duping people into redirecting their election-lie outrage into pillow purchases." Dominion further stated its intentions were to stop Lindell from using MyPillow to profit off of election conspiracy theories at the expense of Dominion.

On March 22, 2021, Powell's attorneys moved to dismiss Dominion's lawsuit against her, arguing that "No reasonable person would conclude that the statements [made by Powell against Dominion] were truly statements of fact ... Plaintiffs themselves characterize the statements at issue as 'wild accusations' and 'outlandish claims'. They are repeatedly labeled 'inherently improbable' and even 'impossible'. Such characterizations of the allegedly defamatory statements further support defendant's position that reasonable people would not accept such statements as fact but view them only as claims that await testing by the courts through the adversary process." They held that she was obviously just expressing an opinion, but not one motivated by malice as "She believed the allegations then and she believes them now."

On March 26, 2021, Dominion filed a $1.6 billion defamation lawsuit against Fox News, alleging that Fox and some of its pundits spread conspiracy theories about Dominion, and allowed guests to make false statements about the company. A Fox News motion to dismiss the suit was denied on December 16, 2021, by a Delaware Superior Court judge.

On August 4, 2021, a federal judge granted a sanctions motion against Gary Fielder and Ernest John Walker, the attorneys that filed suit against Dominion, Facebook, and others claiming fraud in the 2020 presidential election.  Plaintiff's attorneys were ordered to pay $180,000 for the defendants' attorneys' fees, with the judge finding that the lawsuit was filed "in bad faith" and made frivolous arguments.

On August 10, 2021, Dominion announced that they were suing conservative news channels OANN and Newsmax, plus former Overstock.com CEO Patrick M. Byrne. The lawsuit against OANN also named its anchors Chanel Rion and Christina Bobb.

The next day, district judge Carl J. Nichols denied motions by Lindell, Powell, and Giuliani to dismiss the lawsuits against them.

On April 20, 2022, Judge Nichols ruled that Dominion's defamation lawsuit against Byrne could move forward denying his motion to dismiss the case.

In an April 2022 article focusing on the case, Forbes noted that there could be additional lawsuits filed by Dominion which "has identified more than 150 people as potential targets of litigation". It also reported that Dominion has "sent letters to preserve evidence and warning of potential litigation to right-wing figures including pro-Trump attorney Lin Wood and Melissa Carone, who Giuliani has promoted as a witness to supposed voter fraud efforts."

In response to pressure from advocacy groups opposing false claims of electoral fraud, and despite an angry response from U.S. Senator Steve Daines and five Republican state attorney generals (including Ken Paxton and Patrick Morrisey), DirecTV dropped One America News (OAN) from its channel lineup on April 5, 2022. Angelo Carusone of Media Matters for America told reporters that as 90% of OAN's revenue came from DirecTV that the company will not survive through Dominion's lawsuit against it, but will "be wiped out from the litigation costs. Forget about any judgment."

On April 12, 2022, Delaware state court judge Eric Davis scheduled the date for the jury trial for the defamation lawsuit against Fox News to begin on April 17, 2023, and set aside five weeks for proceedings.

Andrew Parker, a lawyer for My Pillow, Inc., on April 18, 2022, filed a countersuit in Minnesota asserting that Dominion is a governmental actor due to contracting with state and local agencies and that it had violated the company's rights under the First and Fourteenth amendment as well as inflicting "tortious interference with prospective business ... using today's cancel culture to eliminate dissent and to cover up the election issues that compromised the 2020 result". As evidence of harm, he stated: "MyPillow employees have been subjected to ridicule in their personal lives, and death threats necessitating protection from local law enforcement ... employees are subjected to daily hateful and barbaric calls, emails, and comments on the company's social media platforms." The Daily Beast reported that Lindell had hired veteran First Amendment lawyer Nathan Lewin, and was also receiving informal advice from Alan Dershowitz, who stated "My role is to come up with ideas as they pertain to the First Amendment. I give them cases, and I suggest First Amendment theories—my role is limited to advising on the First Amendment issues at hand. ... Our position is that Dominion is the government, for purposes of the First Amendment. The government delegated to them the most important governmental function, mainly counting votes in a presidential election. And they are therefore subject to criticism in the exact same ways that the government would be subject to criticism in that situation. And criticism of how the government conducted a presidential election is the highest bar protecting the First Amendment right to criticize such action."

In the US federal district court in Washington D.C., on May 19, 2022, Judge Carl Nichols dismissed a defamation lawsuit brought against Dominion Voting Systems (and also Smartmatic) while also imposing sanctions on Mike Lindell, CEO of MyPillow.
 Lindell had sued the companies for defamation after they had filed suit for defamation against him. Lindell's filing said the companies had "weaponized" the courts in an act of "lawfare" to try to silence him. Nichols ruled Lindell's claims were groundless and frivolous, and partially granted Smartmatic's motion for sanctions and fees against Lindell and his legal team for filing the suit, with the amount to be decided later. Lindell told reporters that he was unconcerned with the ruling as "I've got lawyers doing more important things like removing these machines from every state."

Delaware Superior Court Judge Eric M. Davis, on June 6, 2022, denied a motion from Newsmax to dismiss Dominion's case against them. Judge Davis stated that Newsmax "knew the allegations were probably false" about Dominion's technology, and "there were enough signs indicating the statements were not true to infer Newsmax's intent to avoid the truth". He went on to say that as "Newsmax apparently refused to report contrary evidence, including evidence from the Department of Justice, the allegations support the reasonable inference that Newsmax intended to keep Dominion's side of the story out of the mainstream." He ruled that Dominion had made a "reasonable inference" concerning Newsmax's actions and let the case proceed. On June 21, 2022, Judge Davis also denied Fox Corporation's motion to dismiss the suit by Dominion Voting Systems. He held that Dominion had shown that the company's chairman, Rupert Murdoch, and his son, CEO Lachlan Murdoch, may have acted with "actual malice" by directing the network to broadcast the conspiracy theory despite having been notified that it was false – as a business calculation in order to stem plummeting viewership. Dominion provided the court with reports from various news outlets that Rupert Murdoch had "spoke with Trump and other senior Republicans shortly after the election and urged them to drop their election-fraud narrative and concede defeat". Dominion pointed to a claim that Murdoch urged a Republican leader to ask other party members not to endorse the false theory. Dominion also pointed out that Murdoch's other media outlets The Wall Street Journal and the New York Post condemned the conspiracy theory, and urged Trump to concede, which the court held supported "a reasonable inference that Rupert and Lachlan Murdoch either knew Dominion had not manipulated the election or at least recklessly disregarded the truth", and therefore should be subject to factual discovery. Soon after the court's decision, Fox News, on June 30, 2022, replaced their lead attorney Chip Babcock (a specialist in First Amendment cases) with veteran trial attorney Dan K. Webb. This was seen by legal reporters as "an indication that Fox News expects to go to trial".

On July 11, 2022, the court docket for the case showed that Dominion had issued a subpoena to former Attorney General William Barr. They had also recently issued subpoenas to Georgia Secretary of State Brad Raffensperger; Christopher Krebbs, the former director of the Department of Homeland Security's Cybersecurity and Infrastructure Security Agency; and Benjamin Hovland, the former chairman of the U.S. Election Assistance Commission. In response to the development, a spokesperson for Fox News stated: "We are confident we will prevail as freedom of the press is foundational to our democracy and must be protected, in addition to the damages claims being outrageous, unsupported and not rooted in sound financial analysis, serving as nothing more than a flagrant attempt to deter our journalists from doing their jobs."

In early July 2022, two lawyers from U.K.-based Kennedys Law LLP, Michael J. Tricarico and Marc Casarino joined Powell's legal team of Lawrence J. Joseph and J. Howard Kleinhendler in the defamation cases involving Dominion Voting Systems and Smartmatic. By July 13, 2022, Kleinhendler withdrew from the team. (He along with L. Lin Wood had worked alongside Powell challenging the election results of 2020 in what are sometimes referred to as the "Kraken" cases.)

Media outlets such as the Guardian mentioned the lawsuit against Fox News in late July, when excerpts of Jared Kushner's book Breaking History were released. According to Kushner, he spoke to Rupert Murdoch on election night 2020 after Fox News reported that the electoral votes for Arizona had been won by Joe Biden. "I dialed Rupert Murdoch and asked why Fox News had made the Arizona call before hundreds of thousands of votes were tallied. Rupert said he would look into the issue, and minutes later, he called back. ... [Murdoch told him] 'Sorry Jared, there is nothing I can do. The Fox News data authority says the numbers are ironclad. He says it won't be close.

The New York Times, on August 13, 2022, noted that there had been no movement towards settlement from either Dominion or Fox, and both "are deep into document discovery, combing through years of each other's emails and text messages, and taking depositions". They reported that sources "expected Rupert and Lachlan Murdoch, who own and control the Fox Corporation, to sit for depositions as soon as this month". Citing sources at Fox News, speaking under condition of anonymity, they reported "Anchors and executives have been preparing for depositions and have been forced to hand over months of private emails and text messages to Dominion." Among the current and former Fox personnel who have given or were set to give depositions in August were Steve Doocy, Dana Perino, and Shepard Smith. Sources also told the Times that Dominion was focusing on Lachlan Murdoch's reaction to President Trump's anger at the network calling Arizona for Biden, seeking to place him "in the room when the decisions about election coverage were being made". Accounts hold that the younger Murdoch did not pressure anyone to reverse the call, but "he did ask detailed questions about the process that Fox's election analysts had used after the call became so contentious." While Fox continues to claim that any statements made on air were covered by the First Amendment, and as such can not be considered defamation, the Times reported that "Fox has also been searching for evidence that could, in effect, prove the Dominion conspiracy theories weren't really conspiracy theories." Looking for connections to the Venezuelan dictator who died in 2013, lawyers for Fox in court filings have asked Dominion to turn over any internal communications going back over a decade that include any of the words "Hugo", "Chavez", "tampered", "backdoor", "stolen", or "Trump". Fox's recent replacement of its outside legal team with one of the nation's most prominent trial lawyers was seen as "a sign that executives believe that the chances the case is headed to trial have increased".

In mid-August 2022, documents from the Dauphin County prothonotary's office revealed that Dominion plans to subpoena the Pennsylvania Department of State for records related to its case against Fox News. In accord with this action, they were to seek a deposition from former Secretary of the Commonwealth Kathy Boockvar.

On August 31, 2022 Sean Hannity was deposed by Dominion's lawyers. The New York Times noted that in most defamation cases settlements are reached before any depositions are taken. As an example they pointed to how Fox News had settled in 2020 after the parents of Seth Rich sued due to Hannity and other Fox personnel trying to link his death to an email hack. In that case Fox settled the case before Hannity could be deposed. This was taken as further proof that both sides anticipated the case going to trial.

Dominion's lawyer, Mary Kathryn Sammons, told a Federal court on September 16, 2022, that Mike Lindell was still repeating the same baseless claims against the company: "The problem here is the lawsuit is based on the public figures making very public lies about Dominion. Unfortunately, the lies have continued." She went on to say that the continuing lies have resulted in continued threats of violence against the company. As the case was entering the discovery stage, she expressed concern that Lindell would not abide by the rules of non-disclosure. Judge Nichols set aside time for the parties to designate documents for confidentiality before further action would be taken. Lindell had recently bragged publicly of disregarding an FBI request to not disclose the seizure of his phone in an unrelated criminal case involving Tina Peters, a Republican Mesa County clerk who was charged in engaging in a data breach of Dominion Voting System machines.

It was announced on October 3, 2022, that the Supreme Court of the United States had declined Mike Lindell's appeal against Judge Carl Nichols' ruling; allowing Dominion's case to proceed.

On October 20, 2022, Fox's lawyers asked the court to sanction Dominion alleging they destroyed evidence – electronic messages between CEO John Poulos and senior executives Kay Stinson and Waldeep Singh. Fox argues this should result in the jury being instructed that they "must presume the messages contained information unfavorable to Plaintiffs ... and information undermining Plaintiffs' damages calculation", or that the case be dismissed and Dominion fined for spoliation. Dominion holds Fox's claim about spoliation is "meritless" and "a distraction".

On December 5, 2022, the U.S. Supreme Court declined to take up a case, Kevin O’Rourke, et al., v. Dominion Voting Systems, Inc., et al., rejected by lower courts. The plaintiffs had alleged that Dominion, Facebook, Mark Zuckerberg, Priscilla Chan, and the Center for Tech and Civic Life "engaged in concerted action to interfere with the 2020 presidential election through a coordinated effort to, among other things, change voting laws without legislative approval, use unreliable voting machines, alter votes through an illegitimate adjudication process ... [and] privately fund only certain municipalities and counties". This left in place federal judge N. Reid Neureiter's ruling that the plaintiffs lacked standing.

In early December 2022, the Delaware Superior Court filed notice that Lachlan Murdoch would be deposed under oath at a Los Angeles law firm. The deposition was set to begin on December 5 and "will continue from day to day (Sundays and holidays excluded) until complete, unless otherwise agreed". Also in early December 2022, the Delaware Superior Court filed a notice that Rupert Murdoch would be deposed under oath on December 13–14 via video conference. Previously Fox's lawyers had stated that any efforts to depose the Murdochs and put them at the center of the case would just be a "fruitless fishing expedition".

Summary judgment evidence reveals Fox decision to deliberately lie to viewers 

On February 16, 2023, Dominion Voting Systems filed a motion for summary judgment against Fox News, with dozens of internal communications sent during the months after the 2020 presidential election. They showed several prominent network hosts and senior executives—including chairman Rupert Murdoch and CEO Suzanne Scott—discussing their knowledge that the allegations of election fraud they were reporting were false. The communications showed their concerns that if they did not continue to report these falsehoods, viewers would be alienated and switch to rival conservative networks like Newsmax and OANN, impacting corporate profitability.

Internal texts and other products of discovery against Fox revealed that Tucker Carlson privately doubted the false claims that the 2020 election was stolen and mocked Trump advisors, including Rudy Giuliani and Sydney Powell. Carlson texted to Laura Ingraham, "Sidney Powell is lying by the way. I caught her. It's insane" and "Our viewers are good people and they believe it." Furthermore, Carlson texted to Sean Hannity, saying fellow Fox reporter Jacqui Heinrich should be fired for fact-checking false claims Carlson and Trump circulated about Dominion. He wrote "Please get her fired. Seriously…. What the fuck? I’m actually shocked… It needs to stop immediately, like tonight. It's measurably hurting the company. The stock price is down. Not a joke.", and said he "just went crazy on" a Fox executive over Heinrich's reporting.

Rupert Murdoch privately messaged that Trump's voter fraud claims were "really crazy stuff", telling Fox News CEO Suzanne Scott that it was "terrible stuff damaging everybody, I fear". As a January 2021 Georgia runoff election approached that would determine party control of the U.S. Senate, Murdoch told Scott, "Trump will concede eventually and we should concentrate on Georgia, helping any way we can." When Murdoch was deposed, he acknowledged that some Fox News commentators were endorsing election fraud claims they knew were false.

See also
 List of electronic voting machines in New York state
 Electronic voting in Canada

References

External links
 

2002 establishments in Ontario
Election technology companies
Manufacturing companies based in Toronto
Canadian companies established in 2002
Electronics companies established in 2002
Electronic voting companies